This is a list of the Fall 1981 PGA Tour Qualifying School graduates.

Source:

References 

1980 2
PGA Tour Qualifying School
PGA Tour Qualifying School